Republic of Georgia is the former official name of Georgia before the 1995 constitution came into force.

Republic of Georgia may also refer to:

 Democratic Republic of Georgia, 1918–1921
 Georgian Soviet Socialist Republic, a part of the Soviet Union, 1921–1991
 Republic of Georgia (1861), seceded state of Georgia in the American Civil War